The Ankogel (3,252 m) is a mountain in the Ankogel Group in the eastern High Tauern range in Austria. It is the second highest mountain in the group, the Hochalmspitze being higher at 3,360 m.

A cable car from Mallnitz goes up to 2,631 m on the mountain, making Ankogel one of the most accessible alpine peaks.

References

Alpine three-thousanders
Ankogel Group
Mountains of Carinthia (state)
Mountains of Salzburg (state)
Mountains of the Alps